Ekhi Senar Rekondo (born 26 April 1990 in Barañáin, Navarre), known simply as Ekhi, is a Spanish professional footballer who plays for CD Alfaro as a central defender.

External links

1990 births
Living people
Spanish footballers
Footballers from Navarre
Association football defenders
Segunda División players
Segunda División B players
Primera Federación players
Segunda Federación players
CA Osasuna B players
SD Huesca footballers
Real Unión footballers
Lleida Esportiu footballers